Cybill is an American television sitcom created by Chuck Lorre and starring Cybill Shepherd which aired on CBS from January 2, 1995, to July 13, 1998.

Series overview

Episodes

Season 1 (1995)

Season 2 (1995–96)

Season 3 (1996–97)

Season 4 (1997–98)

References

External links
 
 

Lists of American sitcom episodes